Marcell is an unincorporated community in Marcell Township, Itasca County, Minnesota, United States.

Minnesota State Highways 38 and 286 are two of the main routes in the community.

Marcell is located 28 miles north of Grand Rapids.  The community is located within the Chippewa National Forest.

Nearby places include Bigfork, Talmoon, Bowstring, Deer River, and Effie.

Despite its unincorporated status, Marcell appears on most more detailed maps of Minnesota due to the presence of several locally important businesses and the lack of larger communities in the surrounding area. In addition, it has its own post office with the ZIP code 56657.

History
Marcell was founded under the name Turtle Lake in 1905.  The name was changed to Marcell the following year due to a name conflict with other communities named Turtle Lake.  The name Marcell is in honor of Andy Marcell, a conductor on the former Minneapolis and Rainy River Railway, who was involved in a railway accident in the area.

The site of the town center was originally at a store operated by John Lundeen on Big Turtle Lake, but was moved in 1910 to its present location near the railway.

References

 Rand McNally Road Atlas – 2007 edition – Minnesota entry
 Official State of Minnesota Highway Map – 2011/2012 edition

Further reading
 Newstrom, Curt.  Memories of a Small Town––Marcell, Minnesota

Unincorporated communities in Itasca County, Minnesota
Unincorporated communities in Minnesota
Populated places established in 1905
1905 establishments in Minnesota